Yerkebulan Shamukhanov (born 23 August 1999) is a Kazakhstani short track speed skater. He competed in the 2018 Winter Olympics.

References

1999 births
Living people
Kazakhstani male short track speed skaters
Olympic short track speed skaters of Kazakhstan
Short track speed skaters at the 2018 Winter Olympics
Short track speed skaters at the 2017 Asian Winter Games
Universiade medalists in short track speed skating
Universiade silver medalists for Kazakhstan
Universiade bronze medalists for Kazakhstan
Competitors at the 2019 Winter Universiade
Medalists at the 2019 Winter Universiade
Competitors at the 2023 Winter World University Games
Medalists at the 2023 Winter World University Games
Short track speed skaters at the 2016 Winter Youth Olympics
21st-century Kazakhstani people